Spanning may refer to:

 Disc spanning, a feature of CD and DVD burning software
 File spanning, the ability to package a single file or data stream into separate files of a specified size
 Linear spanning, a concept in abstract algebra
 Spanning tree, a subgraph which is a tree, containing all the vertices of a graph

See also

 Span (disambiguation)
 Spanner (disambiguation)